Duodu may refer to:

Duodu (1057–1062), reign period of Emperor Yizong of Western Xia

People
Fred Osam-Duodu, Ghanaian football coach
Cameron Duodu, Ghanaian author
Eugenia Duodu, Canadian chemist